This is a list of  deputy governors of Jigawa State.
Jigawa State was formed in 1991-08-27 when it was split from Kano State.

References

Jigawa

Governors